Hamadan Seljeh (also Romanized as Ḩamadān Seljeh; also known as Salijeh, Seljeh-e Yek, and Soljeh-ye Yek) is a village in Karkheh Rural District, Hamidiyeh District, Ahvaz County, Khuzestan Province, Iran. At the 2006 census, its population was 103, in 17 families.

References 

Populated places in Ahvaz County